Ahmed-Idriss Moussa is a Djiboutian politician who served in the French National Assembly from 1962-1967. An independent, he was the main opposition candidate in the 1999 presidential election against President Ismaïl Omar Guelleh.

Background
He was a nurse at the Peltier Hospital of Djibouti, then worked at the Banque de l'Indochine.

A nationalist militant, he participated in the founding of the Popular Movement Party (PMP), which he headed. He is elected to the Territorial Assembly on June 23, 1957 on the list of Mahmoud Harbi.
He was elected to the French National Assembly in November 1962, supported by the PMP against Hassan Gouled Aptidon and Ahmed Dini. It sits until 1967 on the benches of the Union for the new Republic (UNR). In 1963, he signed Arta's agreement rejecting foreign claims on the CFS. In 1966 he would again support the independence movements.

At independence, he becomes a deputy. In 1981, he founded an opposition party with Ahmed Dini and Abdallah Mohamed Kamil. He is then arrested. In 1999, he ran in the presidential election against Ismail Omar Guelleh.

References 
 page on the French National Assembly website

1933 births
Living people
Djiboutian politicians
Deputies of the 2nd National Assembly of the French Fifth Republic